Shock Troops is the second album, and the first widely distributed, by punk rock band Cock Sparrer. It was released in 1983 on Razor Records.

Track listing
All titles written by Cock Sparrer

Original release

Side A 
 "Where Are They Now"
 "Riot Squad"
 "Working"
 "Take 'em All"
 "We're Coming Back"

Side B 
 "Watch Your Back"
 "I Got Your Number"
 "Secret Army"
 "Droogs Don't Run"
 "Out on an Island"

Subsequent releases 
 "Where Are They Now"
 "Riot Squad"
 "Working"
 "Take 'em All"
 "We're Coming Back"
 "England Belongs to Me"
 "Watch Your Back"
 "I Got Your Number"
 "Secret Army"
 "Droogs Don't Run"
 "Out on an Island"
 "Argy Bargy"

1993 bonus track 
 "Colonel Bogey"

2001 bonus tracks 
 "I Need A Witness"
 "Platinum Blonde"
 "What's It Like To Be Old?"
 "Teenage Heart"
 "Run For Cover"

Personnel
 Colin McFaul − vocals
 Steve Burgess − bass
 Steve Bruce − drums
 Mickey Beaufoy − lead guitar
 Chris Skepis − rhythm guitar

Release history

In entertainment
"England Belongs To Me" is the entrance song for UFC fighter Dan Hardy.

"I Got Your Number" plays during the jet engine stunt scene in the 2010 American film Jackass 3D.

References

External links
 Cock Sparrer Official Website

1982 albums
Cock Sparrer albums